Giuseppe Sabatelli (June 24, 1813 – February 27, 1843) was an Italian painter.

Biography
Born at Milan, he first trained with his father, the prominent painter Luigi Sabatelli, who taught at the Brera Academy.

In 1834, he moved to Florence along with his older brother Francesco (born 1803). In Florence, Giuseppe became a professor in the Accademia di Belle Arti. He painted both historical subjects and portraits.

Among the works of Giuseppe are Christ frees a Possessed Man (Ossesso) (1828); a Joseph recounts dreams for brothers for the church of Santa Croce; and a Miracle of Sant Antonio (1832) for a church in Rimini.

He is described as: a taciturn, solitary, and pensive character, who avoided the brilliant gatherings of friends, parties, banquets, and even the sweet enticements of love. And he willed to be known for only painting women in shadows.

Despite trying to avoid painting women, he did paint them in a Saint Filomena for San Francesco in Pisa; a Those of Samuel appears to Saul in the Cave of the Witch of Endor; and Farinata degli Uberti alla battaglia del Serchio for Nioccolo Puccini.
In 1836 finished his brother's work, but like his brother also died young from tuberculosis in Florence.

References

1813 births
1843 deaths
19th-century Italian painters
Italian male painters
Painters from Florence
Painters from Milan
Italian neoclassical painters
19th-century Italian male artists